General elections were held in Jamaica on 3 September 2007. They had originally been scheduled for 27 August 2007 but were delayed due to Hurricane Dean. The preliminary results indicated a slim victory for the opposition Jamaican Labour Party (JLP) led by Bruce Golding, which grew by two seats from 31–29 to 33-27 after official recounts. The JLP defeated the People's National Party after eighteen years of unbroken governance.

Results

References

Elections in Jamaica
Jamaica
General election
September 2007 events in North America